Epichoristodes spinulosa is a species of moth of the family Tortricidae. It is found in South Africa, where it has been recorded from the Western Cape.

References

Endemic moths of South Africa
Moths described in 1924
Taxa named by Edward Meyrick
Archipini